Tumors that develop within the liver may be either benign (noncancerous) or malignant (cancerous). Tumors can start in the liver, or spread to the liver from another cancer in the body. Malignant liver tumors have been reported to metastasize to other organs such as regional lymph nodes, lungs, kidneys, pancreas, spleen and others.

Signs and symptoms
Clinical signs are often vague and include weight loss, loss of appetite, fatigue, and possible jaundice.

Diagnosis
Medical imaging techniques such as X-rays, ultrasound, computed tomography (CT), and magnetic resonance imaging (MRI) are often used in evaluating animals with suspected liver tumors. Ultrasound-guided fine-needle aspiration or needle-core biopsy of liver masses are useful diagnostic tools that are minimally invasive to obtain samples for histopathological analysis.

Treatment
Surgical treatment is recommended for cats and dogs diagnosed with primary liver tumors but not metastasis to the liver. There are not many treatment options for animals who have multiple liver lobes affected.

References

External links
 Liver Cancer in Cats and Dogs from Pet Cancer Center
Liver Tumors in Dogs from Pet Place'
Hepatic Neoplasia from Merck Veterinary Manual'
Liver Tumors from Vet Surgery Central
Liver Cancer in Dogs from Alldoghealth'

Cancer in dogs
Cancer in cats
Types of animal cancers